The Southern African Development Community Regional Trunk Road Network or SADC RTRN is a trans nation road network across Southern Africa. The projects in Africa being developed by the United Nations Economic Commission for Africa (UNECA), the African Development Bank (ADB), and the African Union in conjunction with the Southern African Development Community. They aim to promote trade and alleviate poverty in Africa through highway infrastructure development and the management of road-based trade corridors.

Background 
The Southern African Development Community Regional Trunk Road Network (SADC RTRN) is a system of numbered roads in Southern Africa. The core of the network is the reference roads, which are major trans-regional routes. East-west oriented reference roads have a two-digit number with the second digit a 0. North-south oriented reference roads have a two-digit number with the second digit a 5. Intermediate roads connect two reference roads and also have two-digit numbers. Branch, link and connecting roads are less important routes, and are identified with a three-digit number.

Table of Roads 
The Southern African Development Community Regional Trunk Road Network (SADC RTRN) is a system of numbered roads in Southern Africa. The core of the network is the reference roads, which are major trans-regional routes. East-west oriented reference roads have a two-digit number with the second digit a 0. North-south oriented reference roads have a two-digit number with the second digit a 5. Intermediate roads connect two reference roads and also have two-digit numbers. Branch, link and connecting roads are less important routes, and are identified with a three-digit number.

Reference roads

East-West

North–South

Intermediate roads

Branch/link/connecting roads 

 Review of the Regional Trunk Road Network

See also 

 Other intercontinental highway systems: Asian Highway Network, International E-road network and Arab Mashreq International Road Network
 Trans-African Railway

References 

International road networks
Road transport in Africa
Southern African Development Community